Alexander Williams (born 18 October 1967 in London) is an English film cartoonist and animator. He is the son of animator Richard Williams. He has worked on many animated films, and is the author of the Queen's Counsel cartoon strip in The Times, for which he was awarded the Cartoon Art Trust Award for Strip Cartooning in October 2017.

Early life
Williams was born in London in 1967, the son of Canadian animator Richard Williams. He played the voice of Tiny Tim in his father's 1971 television adaptation of A Christmas Carol. He was educated at Westminster School, Camberwell School of Arts and Crafts, and Merton College, Oxford.

Career
In 1987 Williams was 20 years old and in his first year of studies at the University of Oxford when he started work as an in-betweener on Who Framed Roger Rabbit, working under animator Simon Wells and later as an assistant animator to Marc Gordon-Bates. Williams initially worked unpaid as an intern, and was later invited by producer Patsy de Lord to work on the film full-time. The university agreed to his taking a suspension of studies for a year. The following year, in 1988, he joined the Disney-MGM Studio in Orlando, Florida, working on the short film RollerCoaster Rabbit.

Cartoons
 In 1993 Williams and Graham Francis Defries created the comic strip Queen's Counsel, a satire on law and lawyers, published in the law pages of The Times newspaper, under the pseudonyms Steuart and Francis. At the time, Williams and Defries were working as research assistants for Members of Parliament at the House of Commons.

A number of collections of the cartoons have been published by Robson Books and HarperCollins.

Williams also drew Writer's Block, a cartoon strip published in the books section of The Times from 2005–6, and The Dealers, published in The Tatler from 1994–95. He also illustrated the characters for the Baby Barista blog by fellow ex-barrister Tim Kevan.

Animation

Williams was a barrister at 12 King's Bench Walk Chambers in London before leaving in 1996 to pursue a full-time career in film animation, joining Warner Bros Feature Animation, where he was lead animator on the villain "Ruber", voiced by Gary Oldman, in Quest for Camelot. Williams gave the character a "nervous twitch", a "wrestler's strut" and "big hands with broken nails that look creepy on close-ups".

His work as an animator includes Who Framed Roger Rabbit (1988), The Princess and the Cobbler (1993), The Lion King (1994), Quest for Camelot (1998), The Iron Giant (1999), The Road to El Dorado (2000), Spirit: Stallion of the Cimarron (2002), Piglet's Big Movie, Sinbad: Legend of the Seven Seas (2003), Robots (2005) and Open Season (2006).

Williams has also worked on visual effects in Racing Stripes (2005), Monster House (2006), Underdog (2007), Beverly Hills Chihuahua, Inkheart (2008), Harry Potter and the Half-Blood Prince (2009), Marmaduke (2010) and The Chronicles of Narnia: The Voyage of the Dawn Treader (2010)

He has contributed designs to Deckchair Dreams, a fundraising event organised by the Royal Parks Foundation in support of the London Royal Parks. In 2012 he contributed a design for The Big Egg Hunt, a charity fundraiser billed as the world's largest ever Easter egg hunt.

Teaching
He lives in London and teaches at various academies and studios including Escape Studios, however now tutors animation at Bucks New University in High Wycombe as a senior lecturer.

Williams has also founded the world's first online based MA in animation at Buckinghamshire New University, beginning in September 2015.

In 2012 he founded an online animation school, Animation Apprentice.

Published work
 Queen's Counsel – A Libellous Look at The law, Robson Books, 1995
 Queen's Counsel – Judgment Day, Robson Books, 1996
 Queen's Counsel – Laying Down the Law, Times Books, 1997
 The Times – Best of Queen's Counsel, Times Books, 1999
 Lawyers Uncovered – Everything you always wanted to know but didn't want to pay £500 an hour to find out, JR Books, 2007
 101 Ways to Leave the Law, JR Books, September 2009
 101 Uses for a Useless Banker. JR books, September 2009
 The Queen's Counsel Official Lawyers' Handbook, Robson Press October 2011
 The Queen's Counsel Lawyer's Omnibus, Law Brief Publishing, 1 October 2013
 For a Few Guineas More - The Legal Year in Cartoons, Law Brief Publishing, 13 December 2019

References
 Nelker, Gladys P, The Clan Steuart, Genealogical publishing, 1970
 Mazurkewitch, Karen, Cartoon Capers, The Adventures of Canadian Animators, MacArthur & Co, Toronto (1999) 
  Retrieved June 2011
 The Jester Monthly Magazine of The Cartoonists' Club of Great Britain, Issue 463, March 2013
 News item at Variety.com Retrieved June 2011
 News item at Hollywood Reporter Retrieved June 2011
 News item at AWN.com Retrieved June 2011
 Interview at the Evening Standard Retrieved July 2017

Notes

External links
 Williams' Official Website Retrieved June 2011
 Queen's Counsel Official Website Retrieved June 2011
 Escape Studios animation course Retrieved June 2011
 Lawyers Uncovered – a collection of Queen's Counsel cartoons at Amazon.com Retrieved June 2011
 Queen's Counsel at The Times Online (subscription only) Retrieved June 2011
 Interview with Williams at Skwigly Retrieved June 2011
 Interview with Williams at Flip magazine Retrieved June 2011
 transcript of lecture by Williams at Imagine Magazine website Retrieved June 2011
 Online Animation School Retrieved September 2012

English animators
British animators
1967 births
Artists from London
Living people
English barristers
Alumni of Merton College, Oxford
People educated at Westminster School, London
English cartoonists
British cartoonists
British comic strip cartoonists
Alumni of Camberwell College of Arts
British comics artists
British people of Canadian descent
Walt Disney Animation Studios people
DreamWorks Animation people